Molokanovo is a rural locality (a selo) in Yermolayevsky Selsoviet, Kuyurgazinsky District, Bashkortostan, Russia. The population was 338 as of 2010. There are 6 streets.

Geography 
Molokanovo is located 14 km southwest of Yermolayevo (the district's administrative centre) by road. Dedovsky is the nearest rural locality.

References 

Rural localities in Kuyurgazinsky District